The Last Ride is a 2004 American action drama television film directed by Guy Norman Bee and starring Dennis Hopper, Will Patton, Chris Carmack, Nadine Velazquez and Fred Ward. The story for the film  was written by Rob Cohen, well known for directing another automotive action film, The Fast and the Furious (2001).

The movie premiered on June 2, 2004, on the USA Network and, at the time of its release, was primarily used by General Motors to market the new Pontiac GTO. During late 2004 and early 2005, it was also released in several countries outside the United States, mostly as a straight-to-DVD movie.

Plot 
In 1970, Ronnie Purnell is arrested at the California–Mexico border after a robbery and jailed for more than 30 years. Since Purnell's wife was killed during the chase with the police, California Highway Patrol Officer Darryl Kurtz took care of their son Aaron. When Ronnie is released from jail, he decides to take vengeance on Darryl. Aaron has also become a cop and doesn't want to hear about his father anymore, but Aaron's son Matthew, a San Diego street racer, is fascinated by his grandfather's past. Matthew decides to help Ronnie find his old car, a 1969 Pontiac GTO Judge, in which he stashed a key for a safe containing evidence against Darryl.

Cast
 Dennis Hopper as Ronnie Purnell
 Will Patton as Aaron Purnell
 Chris Carmack as Matthew Purnell
 Fred Ward as Darryl Kurtz
 Nadine Velazquez as J.J. Cruz
 Peter Onorati as Burt Walling

Production
Rob Cohen came up with the idea for the film while directing commercials for the 2004 Pontiac GTO. Filming took place in San Diego.

See also

 List of media set in San Diego

References

External links
 

2004 television films
2004 films
2004 action drama films
2004 action thriller films
2004 crime drama films
2004 crime thriller films
2000s American films
2000s English-language films
Action television films
American action drama films
American action thriller films
American auto racing films
American crime drama films
American crime thriller films
American drama television films
American films about revenge
American thriller television films
Crime television films
Films about automobiles
Films about father–son relationships
Films set in 1970
Films set in 2004
Films set in San Diego
Films shot in San Diego
USA Network original films